White Barbadians or European Barbadians are Barbadian citizens or residents of European descent. The majority of European Barbadians are descended from English, Portuguese, and Scottish settlers and Irish indentured servants and settlers, who arrived during the British colonial period. Other European groups consisted of the French, Germans, Austrians, Spaniards, Italians, and Russians. In addition, some of those considered to be European Barbadians are of partial European ancestry and vice versa. CIA World Factbook estimates that there are some 20,000 white Barbadians in the country.

At first, Indigenous constituted the majority of the Barbadian population. Post-colonization Europeans constituted the majority, with the island being used as a penal colony much as Australia would be later, until the transition of the Barbadian economy to one based on sugarcane production; importation of African slaves to the island altered the demographics of the island, making European Barbadians a minority. During much of the colonial period, whites formed the island's political and economic elite. Since independence from Britain in 1966 when most European Barbadians left for the United Kingdom, most political power has shifted to the black majority.

Among European Barbadians, there exists an underclass of predominantly Irish descent known as redlegs; the descendants of indentured servants, and prisoners imported to the island, redlegs have historically formed a disadvantaged group within Barbadian society.

History
Spaniards were the first Europeans to discover and land in Barbados. The Spanish regularly seized large numbers of Amerindians from Barbados to be used as slave labour on other regional plantations. This prompted the Kalinago to flee Barbados for other Caribbean destinations such as Dominica and St. Vincent. Europeans have caused the disappearance of the indigenous people in Barbados. The first white European settlement on Barbados consisted of British colonists.

Notable European Barbadians

Sir James Drax (d. 1662), a pioneer sugar grower and 'plantocrat' (born in England before settling in Barbados)
Theodorious Paleologus (c. 1660–1693), sailor and privateer, last surviving male descendant of the Paleologus dynasty
Stede Bonnet (1688–1718), pirate
Neville Goddard (1905-1972), author and mystic 
Robert Lettis Hooper (d. 1738/9), politician and jurist in colonial New Jersey
Humphrey Fleming Senhouse (1781–1841), officer of the Royal Navy
Tony Cozier (10 July 1940 – 11 May 2016), journalist and West Indian Cricket Commentator
Zane Maloney (b. 2003), racing driver
Ward Simpson, businessman

See also

Barbadians
White people
Demographics of Barbados
Irish indentured servants
History of the Jews in Barbados

References 

 
 
European diaspora in North America
Scottish Caribbean
Ethnic groups in Barbados
White Caribbean